The Tortue River South-West River (in French: rivière Tortue Sud-Ouest) is a tributary of the west bank of the Tortue River, which flows on the south shore of the St. Lawrence River, east of the village of L'Islet-sur-Mer.

Toponymy 
The Southwest Tortue River toponym is derived from the name of the main river, the Tortue River. The use of animal names is frequent in French Canadian toponymy to designate watercourses. The term turtle usually refers to slow current due to the low drop.

The toponym Rivière Tortue Sud-Ouest was made official on December 5, 1968 at the Commission de toponymie du Québec.

See also 

 List of rivers of Quebec

References 

Rivers of Chaudière-Appalaches
L'Islet Regional County Municipality